Scottish Young Greens (SYG) is the independent youth wing of the Scottish Greens.

SYG campaign on green politics and youth politics. Membership of the Scottish Young Greens is open to anyone aged 12 to 30 years old, and any student enrolled in higher or further education, so long as they are not members of a rival political party. The Scottish Young Greens have a close working relationship with the party's other representative and interest groups, and are a Member Organisation of the Federation of Young European Greens.

History
Scottish Young Greens formally, and amicably, split from the Young Greens of England and Wales in 2003, more than ten years after the Scottish Green Party and the Green Party of England and Wales had similarly split. To this day, the two youth wings remain independent organisations.

Scottish Young Greens have variously campaigned for the Scottish and UK Climate Bills, Fairtrade Universities, Votes at 16, a Free, Fair and Funded Education System, and against HMO Quotas. In 2007, they revealed that the University of Edinburgh invested substantially in TOTAL Oil, the biggest financial supporters of the Burmese Junta. Scottish Young Greens were also central to the preparations for the protests at the 2005 G8 Summit in Scotland.

Following the 2014 Scottish independence referendum, a significant increase in the membership of the Scottish Green Party resulted in an influx of many new Young Greens.

In 2015, they launched their own manifesto ahead of the 2015 general election, including calls for the removal of benefit sanctions and the abolition of the so-called Bedroom tax.

During COP26 in November 2021, the Scottish Young Greens hosted a number of events at a Youth Hub, working closely with the Global Young Greens and the Federation of Young European Greens.

National Council
The day-to-day running of the Scottish Young Greens is managed by the Scottish Young Greens National Council. National Council meets monthly and is led by the two Co-Convenors, who chair Council meetings, lead the SYG as a whole, and help to organise and support the rest of Council. National Council is elected annually at an Annual General Meeting in the summer, and nominations are open to any members of the Scottish Young Greens.

As of 2022, there are currently 14 full members of Council, 

The 2022-23 National council consists of:

Co-Convenors: Sophie Brodie & Alyson Mackay

Secretary

Welfare Officer: Harry Quinn

Elections & Campaigns Officer: Niall McGeechan

Social Media Officer: Amy Kettyles

Website & Content Officer: Neil Watson

Membership Secretary: Evan Macdonald

Equality & Inclusion Officer: Heather Gilda

International Officer: Cameron Garrett

Policy Officer: Ryan Kelly

Events Officer: Eryn Browning

Ordinary Members: Stewart Rooney & Kaelan Donnachie

alongside ex-officio members from each of the local area groups and affiliated student groups.

Sub-Groups
The Scottish Young Greens currently have six local area groups:
 Glasgow & West Young Greens
 Highlands & Islands Young Greens
 Lothian Young Greens
 Mid-Scot, Fife & Central Young Greens
 North East Young Greens
 South Scotland Young Greens

Additionally, a number of universities and colleges across Scotland have student groups affiliated with the Scottish Young Greens:
 Abertay Greens
 Edinburgh University Young Greens
 Strathclyde Greens
 UofG Greens
 UWS Greens

In 2021, the Scottish Young Greens officially launched Young Green Women - a project in collaboration with the Scottish Green Party Women's Network.

Notable members
A number of Scottish Young Greens have been elected to public office. Ross Greer became the youngest MSP ever elected to the Scottish Parliament in the 2016 elections, representing the West Scotland region, and in the 2021 Scottish Parliament election, former Scottish Young Greens co-convener Gillian Mackay was elected as the first ever Scottish Greens MSP for Central Scotland. In the 2017 local elections, 16% of Scottish Green Party candidates were Young Greens. Three were elected as councillors, out of a total of 19 Green councillors across Scotland, all to Glasgow City Council - Kim Long, Christy Mearns, and Allan Young. In the 2022 local elections, nearly a third of all elected Scottish Green Party councillors were Young Greens, with eleven Scottish Young Greens members elected in total.

Scottish Young Greens have also had a certain amount of success in student politics. Former Rector of the University of Edinburgh Peter McColl was Convener of the Young Greens between 2008 and 2010, and the Scottish Young Greens led the successful election campaign of Mark Ballard as Rector of Edinburgh University. A number of current and former Presidents and Vice Presidents of students' associations including UWS Students' Union, Stirling Students' Union, Edinburgh University Students' Association, Aberdeen University Students' Association and Glasgow University SRC have been Young Greens. 

The 2004–2005 Deputy President of NUS Scotland, Phyl Meyer, was also a Young Green, as was 2011–2013 NUS Scotland President Robin Parker. In 2022, Ellie Gomersall became the first incumbent Co-Convenor of the Scottish Young Greens to be elected NUS Scotland President when she was elected for a two-year term.

A number of Scottish Young Greens members have been Members of the Scottish Youth Parliament, including James Smyth and Ross Greer (2011–2013), and former Chair of the Scottish Youth Parliament, Jack Dudgeon (2019–2020).

References

External links
 Scottish Young Greens official website
 Scottish Green Party
 Federation of Young European Greens

Scottish Green Party
Youth wings of green parties in Europe
Greens